Lonsdaleite (named in honour of Kathleen Lonsdale), also called hexagonal diamond in reference to the crystal structure, is an allotrope of carbon with a hexagonal lattice, as opposed to the cubical lattice of conventional diamond. It is found in nature in meteorite debris; when meteors containing graphite strike the Earth, the immense heat and stress of the impact transforms the graphite into diamond, but retains graphite's hexagonal crystal lattice. Lonsdaleite was first identified in 1967 from the Canyon Diablo meteorite, where it occurs as microscopic crystals associated with ordinary diamond.

It is translucent and brownish-yellow and has an index of refraction of 2.40–2.41 and a specific gravity of 3.2–3.3 . Its hardness is theoretically superior to that of cubic diamond (up to 58% more), according to computational simulations, but natural specimens exhibited somewhat lower hardness through a large range of values (from 7–8 on Mohs hardness scale). The cause is speculated as being due to the samples having been riddled with lattice defects and impurities.

In addition to meteorite deposits, hexagonal diamond has been synthesized in the laboratory (1966 or earlier; published in 1967) by compressing and heating graphite either in a static press or using explosives.

Hardness
According to the conventional interpretation of the results of examining the meagre samples collected from meteorites or manufactured in the lab, lonsdaleite has a hexagonal unit cell, related to the diamond unit cell in the same way that the hexagonal and cubic close packed crystal systems are related. Its diamond structure can be considered to be made up of interlocking rings of six carbon atoms, in the chair conformation. In lonsdaleite, some rings are in the boat conformation instead. At nanoscale dimensions, cubic diamond is represented by diamondoids while hexagonal diamond is represented by wurtzoids.

In diamond, all the carbon-to-carbon bonds, both within a layer of rings and between them, are in the staggered conformation, thus causing all four cubic-diagonal directions to be equivalent; whereas in lonsdaleite the bonds between layers are in the eclipsed conformation, which defines the axis of hexagonal symmetry.

Mineralogical simulation predicts lonsdaleite to be 58% harder than diamond on the <100> face, and to resist indentation pressures of 152 GPa, whereas diamond would break at 97 GPa. This is yet exceeded by IIa diamond's <111> tip hardness of 162 GPa.

The extrapolated properties of lonsdaleite have been questioned, particularly its superior hardness, since specimens under crystallographic inspection have not shown a bulk hexagonal lattice structure, but instead a conventional cubic diamond dominated by structural defects that include hexagonal sequences. A quantitative analysis of the X-ray diffraction data of lonsdaleite has shown that about equal amounts of hexagonal and cubic stacking sequences are present. Consequently, it has been suggested that "stacking disordered diamond" is the most accurate structural description of lonsdaleite. On the other hand, recent shock experiments with in situ X-ray diffraction show strong evidence for creation of relatively pure lonsdaleite in dynamic high-pressure environments comparable to meteorite impacts.

Occurrence

Lonsdaleite occurs as microscopic crystals associated with diamond in several meteorites: Canyon Diablo, Kenna, and Allan Hills 77283. It is also naturally occurring in non-bolide diamond placer deposits in the Sakha Republic.  Material with d-spacings consistent with Lonsdaleite has been found in sediments with highly uncertain dates at Lake Cuitzeo, in the state of Guanajuato, Mexico, by proponents of the controversial Younger Dryas impact hypothesis. Claims of Lonsdaleite and other nanodiamonds in a layer of the Greenland ice sheet that could be of Younger Dryas age have not been confirmed and are now disputed. Its presence in local peat deposits is claimed as evidence for the Tunguska event being caused by a meteor rather than by a cometary fragment.

Manufacture

In 2020, researchers at Australian National University found by accident they were able to produce lonsdaleite at room temperatures using a diamond anvil cell.

In 2021, Washington State University's Institute for Shock Physics published a paper stating that they created lonsdaleite crystals large enough to measure their stiffness, confirming that they are stiffer than common cubic diamonds. However, the explosion used to create these crystals also destroys them nanoseconds later, providing just enough time to measure stiffness with lasers.

See also

References

Further reading

External links
 
 
 
 
 

Native element minerals
Meteorite minerals
Allotropes of carbon
Superhard materials